Mangudi Minor is a 1978 Indian Tamil-language film directed by V. C. Gunanathan. Vijayakumar played the lead role and Rajinikanth acted as villain in this film. The film is a remake of the Hindi film Raampur Ka Lakshman.

Plot 

Kedarnath and Laxman are then adopted by a kind-hearted person.
Laxman faces a tough choice, whether to save Prakash or his real brother Ram.

Cast 
Vijayakumar as Lakshman (Mangudi Minor)
Rajinikanth as Kumar
Sripriya as Rekha
M. N. Rajam as Lakshman's mother
Arunprakash as Prakash
Ceylon Manohar as Prathap
S. V. Ramadoss as Kumar's uncle
A. Sakunthala as Julie

Production 
The film was a remake of the Hindi film Rampur Ka Lakshman. When Guhanathan approached Rajinikanth to act in the film, he initially refused to act due to busy schedule; however, he later accepted and completed his work within 9 days.

Soundtrack 
All songs were written by Vaali and composed by Chandrabose.

References

External links 
 

1970s Tamil-language films
1978 films
Films directed by V. C. Guhanathan
Films scored by Chandrabose (composer)
Indian black-and-white films
Tamil remakes of Hindi films